CKJS is a multilingual radio station which operates at 92.7 FM. The station broadcasts from Polo Park in Winnipeg, Manitoba with sister stations CFJL-FM and CHWE-FM, while its transmitter is located at Duff Roblin Provincial Park just south of Winnipeg.

The station is the only multilingual radio station in Manitoba serving more than twenty different ethnic groups.

History 
The station was founded in 1974 by Casimir Stanczykowski; CKJS was the second station to be established by Stanczykowski, behind Montreal's multicultural station CFMB.

In the 1980's it also boasted, for a very short time, a cutting edge alternative music program (well before such programs existed on AM radio in particular) called Nightbeat. This program was responsible for promoting local talent and giving airplay to music that wasn't being played on mainstream radio.

In 2006, the station was sold to Newcap Broadcasting. In May 2011, Newcap announced the sale of both CKJS and CHNK-FM to Evanov Communications, pending CRTC approval. The deal was approved on October 24, 2011. In November 2014, Evanov announced that it would acquire CFMB, which re-united both of Stanczykowski's stations under common ownership.

In November 2017, Evanov received CRTC approval to convert CKJS to an FM station on 92.7 FM.

On September 21, 2021, CKJS began simulcasting on its new FM frequency, and in HD Radio—the first station in Manitoba to do so. CJKS's AM signal continued operations until February 21, 2022, after which it was shut down—completing its transition to FM.

Programming
CKJS airs programming in the following languages: Bulgarian, Chinese, Filipino, German, Hindi, Hungarian, Irish, Jewish, Polish, Portuguese, Punjabi, Spanish, Ukrainian and Vietnamese. It also broadcasts blocks of Christian programming on weekdays and Sundays.

Notes
92.7 is a first adjacent frequency of 92.9 that was formerly used by CKIC-FM which left the air in 2012. Gill Broadcasting applied to use CKIC's former 92.9 frequency in Winnipeg for a new ethnic/multilingual radio station that was denied by the CRTC in 2015 
but was later used by CKYZ-FM a low-power 50 watt tourist information station owned by Gill Broadcasting without a CRTC license until it moved to 96.9 MHz in 2018  after Evanov received approval from the CRTC to convert CKJS to the FM band at 92.7 MHz in 2017.

References

External links
 CKJS FM 92.7
 History of CKJS-FM - Canadian Communications Foundation

Kjs
Kjs
Kjs
Radio stations established in 1974
1974 establishments in Manitoba